Robert Emmett Bowden (29 March 1887 – 17 October 1964) was an Australian rules footballer who played with Collingwood, Richmond and St Kilda in the Victorian Football League (VFL).

Bowden, a wingman, came from Burnley originally and started his league career at Collingwood. He joined Richmond in 1908 for the club's inaugural VFL season and took part in their first ever game, eventually amassing a club record 83 appearances by the time he crossed to St Kilda in 1913. Playing on a wing, Bowden was a member of St Kilda's losing 1913 VFL Grand Final team.

References

External links

Holmesby, Russell and Main, Jim (2007). The Encyclopedia of AFL Footballers. 7th ed. Melbourne: Bas Publishing.

1887 births
Australian rules footballers from Melbourne
Collingwood Football Club players
Richmond Football Club players
St Kilda Football Club players
1964 deaths
People from Richmond, Victoria